The triquetra (from the Latin adjective triquetrus "three-cornered") is a triangular figure composed of three interlaced arcs, or (equivalently) three overlapping vesicae piscis lens shapes. It is used as an ornamental design in architecture, and in medieval manuscript illumination (particularly in the Insular tradition). Its depiction as interlaced is common in Insular ornaments from about the 7th century. In this interpretation, the triquetra represents the topologically simplest possible knot.

History

Iron Age
The term triquetra in archaeology is used of any figure consisting of three arcs, including a pinwheel design of the type of the triskeles. Such symbols become frequent from about the 4th century BC ornamented ceramics of Anatolia and Persia, and it appears on early Lycian coins.

The triquetra is found on runestones in Northern Europe, such as the Funbo Runestones, and on early Germanic coins. It bears a resemblance to the valknut, a design of three interlacing triangles, found in the same context.

Insular art
The triquetra is often found in insular art, most notably metal work and in illuminated manuscripts like the Book of Kells. It is a "minor though recurring theme" in the secondary phase of Anglo-Saxon sceatta production (c. 710–760). It is found in similar artwork on early Christian High Crosses and slabs. An example from early medieval stonework is the Anglo-Saxon frithstool at Hexham Abbey.

The symbol has been interpreted as representing the Christian Trinity, especially since the Celtic revival of the 19th century. The original intention by the early medieval artists is unknown and experts warn against over-interpretation. It is, however, regularly used as a Trinitarian symbol in contemporary Christian iconography.

Buddhist tradition
The triquetra has been a known symbol in Japan called Musubi Mitsugashiwa. Being one of the forms of the Aryan Iakšaku dynasty signs, it reached Japan with the dynasty's Kāśyapīya spreading technology and Buddhism via Kingdom of Khotan, China and Korea.

Modern use

The triquetra is often used artistically as a design element when Celtic knotwork is used, especially in association with the modern Celtic Nations. The triquetra, also known as a "trinity knot", is often found as a design element is popular Irish jewelry such as claddaghs and other wedding or engagement rings.

Celtic pagans or neopagans who are not of a Celtic cultural orientation may use the triquetra to symbolise a variety of concepts and mythological figures. Due to its presence in insular Celtic art, Celtic Reconstructionists use the triquetra either to represent one of the various triplicities in their cosmology and theology (such as the tripartite division of the world into the realms of Land, Sea and Sky), or as a symbol of one of the specific Celtic triple goddesses, for example the battle goddess, The Morrígan. The symbol is also sometimes used by Wiccans, White Witches, and some New Agers to symbolise the Triple Goddess, or as a protective symbol.

In the 1998-2006 American fantasy drama Charmed, that ran on the now defunct The WB network, the triquetra was prominently used as a symbol on the Halliwell's Book of Shadows, the book of spells, potions, and other information the sisters used to fight evil. The triquetra was also used as a symbol of Charmed Ones and their collective Power of Three. The triquetra would be seen to fracture and pull apart on the Book of Shadows when their bond was temporarily broken by a demon. It was also featured prominently in the opening credits of each episode throughout its eight season run. The symbol was also used in the 2018 reboot that ran on The CW.

In the TV series The Walking Dead (2010), Michonne's katana features a triquetra, chosen for its meaning as a "triple goddess symbol".

In the German Netflix series Dark (2017), it symbolizes the caves' closed time loops with each loop being 33 years apart, with the past affecting the future and the future influencing the past. The Triquetra is of significant symbolic value to the time travelers. This symbol can be seen on the Cave's metal door, on the Emerald Tablet, in The Stranger's papers, and in the Sic Mundus photo. 

Thor's hammer, Mjölnir, dons the Triquetra on its surface in the 2011 film Thor. After Odin speaks the words, "Whosoever holds this hammer, if he be worthy, shall possess the power of Thor,” to Mjölnir, the Triquetra vanishes. It represents Asgard, Midgard, and Utgard.

Gallery

Variant forms

See also
 Borromean rings
 Three hares

References

Further reading

 H. Trætteberg, E. Moltke, I. Lindeberg, "Triquetra" in: Kulturhistorisk leksikon for nordisk middelalder, vol. 18 (1982), p. 634–6356.
 Martin Blindheim: Graffiti in Norwegian stave churches c. 1150 – c. 1350, Oslo 1985, i.a. p. 44–45

External links
 

Celtic art
Christian symbols
Church architecture
Early Germanic symbols
Iconography
Irish culture
Ornaments
Religious symbols
Romanesque art
Rotational symmetry
Symbols
Visual motifs
Piecewise-circular curves